The 21st Arabian Gulf Cup was the twenty-first edition of the biennial football competition. It took place in Bahrain in January 2013. The competition was originally scheduled to be hosted in the city of Basra, Iraq, but was moved to Bahrain in October 2011 to ensure that Iraq could suitably host the competition in the 22nd edition.

Seeding of teams
The eight participating teams were divided into two groups, Bahrain (the host nation) were placed in Group A, Kuwait (the holder) in Group B, while the rest of the teams were placed in a pot based on FIFA rankings. The draw was held in Bahrain on 18 October 2012.

Venues

Opening ceremony
The opening ceremony of the 21st Arabian Gulf Cup took place in the Bahrain National Stadium on 5 January. The event featured the attendance of Hamad bin Isa al Khalifa, the King of Bahrain, members of the ruling family, Sepp Blatter, the president of FIFA, Michel Platini, the president of UEFA as well as other officials.  Blatter commended the ceremony, stating that "The opening ceremony was very nice: 9.5 out of 10 because perfection does not exist".  Following the ceremony, Blatter also stated that the organisational level of the Gulf Cup would have to be improved if it was to be a FIFA-sanctioned event and wanted the cup to be played simultaneously with the Africa Cup of Nations.

Squads

Group stage

All times are local time (UTC+03:00).

Group A

Group B

Knockout stage

Semi-finals

Third place play-off

Final

Goalscorers
3 goals

 Abdulhadi Khamis
 Ahmed Khalil

2 goals

 Hammadi Ahmad
 Younis Mahmoud
 Bader Al-Mutawa
 Yousef Nasser
 Khalfan Ibrahim
 Omar Abdulrahman
 Ali Mabkhout

1 goal

 Faouzi Mubarak Aaish
 Hussain Ali Baba
 Abdulwahab Al Malood
 Abdulla Yusuf
 Dhurgham Ismail
 Salam Shaker
 Abdulrahman Bani
 Abdulaziz Al Salimi
 Ismail Al Hammadi
 Majed Hassan
 Mohamed Ahmed Gharib
 Fahad Al-Muwallad
 Yasser Al-Qahtani
 Hussain Al-Hadhri
 Mohamed El-Sayed

1 own goal
 Osama Hawsawi (playing against Iraq)

Team statistics
This table shows all team performance.

Prize money and awards

Prize money 
The football associations were given prize money for a fourth place and above finish in the competition in riyals. 

First Place: 2,000,000 Riyals
Second Place: 1,500,000 Riyals
Third Place: 500,000 Riyals
Fourth Place: 250,000 Riyals

Playing awards 
The following awards were given:

References

External links 
 Official Site
 Gulf Cup website

 
2013
2013 in Asian football
2012–13 in Bahraini football
2012–13 in Omani football
2012–13 in Emirati football
2012–13 in Yemeni football
2012–13 in Saudi Arabian football
2012–13 in Kuwaiti football
2012–13 in Iraqi football
2012–13 in Qatari football
Arabian Gulf Cup